This is a list of lakes of Guinea-Bissau, located completely or partially within the country's borders.

Lakes
 Cufada Lagoon
 Vendu Barássià
 Vendu Boliangà
 Vendu Cambenha
 Vendu Cantoro
 Vendu Chamo
 Vendu Coli
 Vendu Culambai
 Vendu Diderè Nora
 Vendu Jangalá
 Vendu Massabo

References

Guinea-Bissau
Lakes